Seutera is a genus of plants in the family Apocynaceae, first described as a genus in 1828. The name went unused until revived in 2006. It is native to Mexico, the West Indies, and the southeastern United States.

Species

Seutera angustifolia (Pers.) Fishbein & W.D. Stevens (syn Cynanchum angustifolium, C. palustre, Funastrum angustifolium, Ceropegia palustre, Amphistelma salinarum, etc.) - Cuba, southeastern United States, Veracruz, Yucatán Peninsula
Seutera palmeri (S. Watson) Fishbein & W.D. Stevens (syn. Cynanchum palmeri, C. peninsulare etc.) - Baja California Sur

Formerly included

Seutera wilfordii (Maxim.) Pobed synonym of  Cynanchum wilfordii (Maxim.) Hemsl.

References

Asclepiadoideae
Apocynaceae genera
Taxa named by Ludwig Reichenbach